Waihiga Mwaura (born 6 June, 1984) is a Kenyan journalist who, in 2018, won the BBC World News Komla Dumor Award.

Mwaura is an anchor on Citizen TV. He is married to Joyce Omondi.

Early life and education 
Mwaura was born on 6 June, 1984 to parents who are both lawyers. He has two siblings and the his family lives in Donholm and then the Westlands neighbourhood of Nairobi.

He has a bachelor's degree in computer science from the African Nazarene University, and took a master's degree in communications.

Career 
After graduation, Mwaura took an internship at a non-governmental organisation and worked briefly at a bank. His journalism career started in 2008 when he was employed as an intern on the Business Desk of Nation Media Group. He joined Citizen TV's producers Royal Media Services in 2009 where he worked as a producer, and as presenter on the Power Breakfast Show and on Citizen Weekend, as well as presenting the Zinduka show. He won the CNN's African Journalist Award, Sport Award in 2012, and in 2015, he won the Mohammed Amin Africa award. He later took on news presenting at Citizen TV. In 2018, he won the  BBC World News Komla Dumor Award.

Personal life 
Mwaura is married to gospel singer Joyce Omondi. His younger sister Gathoni Mwaura died in 2022.

His is a christian and worked as a master of ceremonies at his local church.

His father, David Mwaure Waihiga, unsuccessfully ran for President of Kenya in the 2022 Kenyan general election.

References

External links 
 Official website

Kenyan journalists
Living people
Kenyan producers
Kenyan television journalists
Kenyan television presenters
1984 births
People from Nairobi